Loffe as a Millionaire (Swedish: Loffe som miljonär) is a 1948 Swedish comedy film directed by Gösta Bernhard and starring Elof Ahrle, Sture Lagerwall and Irene Söderblom. It was shot at the Imagoateljéerna Studios in the Stockholm suburb of Stocksund. The film's sets were designed by the art director Nils Nilsson. It was a sequel to the film Loffe the Tramp released earlier the same year.

Cast
 Elof Ahrle as Loffe Frid
 Sture Lagerwall as 	Heller
 Irene Söderblom as 	Lisa Lagberg 
 Fritiof Billquist as 	Magnus Häggström 
 Marianne Gyllenhammar as 	Ingrid alias Valencia
 Wiktor Andersson as 	Trubbnos 
 Rut Holm as 	Tora 
 Carl-Gustaf Lindstedt as 	One of the Knas Brothers 
 Nils Olsson as 	One of the Knas Brothers 
 Gunnar 'Knas' Lindkvist as	One of the Knas Brothers
 Harry Rydberg as 	Lången, Tramp 
 Harry Sylvner as 	Skånske Viktor, Tramp 
 Alf Östlund as 	Helmer Igelstam
 Arne Källerud as 	Actor
 Arne Lindblad as 	Greven, Tramp
 Gösta Jonsson as 	Jealous Actor
 Birgit Wåhlander as 	Mrs. Häggström
 Gunnel Wadner as Nurse 
 Rune Stylander as Constable
 Uno Larsson as Tramp 
 John Melin as 	Actor
 Stig Johanson as 	Pesant 
 Ulla-Carin Rydén as 	Actress from Oskarshamn
 Alexander von Baumgarten as Ulven Pettersson, Tramp 
 Ivar Wahlgren as 	Åkesson, Dentist 
 Hugo Jacobsson as Second Dentist 
 Siegfried Fischer as Inn-keeper 
 Astrid Bodin as 	Maid
 Georg Adelly as 	Boxer 
 Gösta Bodin as Knight Kuno 
 Curt 'Minimal' Åström as 	Book Keeper

References

Bibliography 
 Goble, Alan. The Complete Index to Literary Sources in Film. Walter de Gruyter, 1999.

External links 
 

1948 films
Swedish comedy films
1948 comedy films
1940s Swedish-language films
Films directed by Gösta Bernhard
Swedish sequel films
1940s Swedish films